The Infond Open was a tournament for professional female tennis players played on clay courts. The event was classified as a $15,000 ITF Women's Circuit tournament and was held in Maribor, Slovenia, from 1996 to 2018.

The tournament was known as the Maribor Open until 2000, then in 2001–2002 as the IGM Stavbar Open, in 2003 as the Maribor Ladies Open and has held its current name, Infond Open, since 2004. The events in 2008 and 2010 each had a prize fund totalling $50,000.

Past finals

Singles

Doubles

References

External links 
  

ITF Women's World Tennis Tour
Clay court tennis tournaments
Tennis tournaments in Slovenia
Sport in Maribor
Recurring sporting events established in 1996
Recurring sporting events disestablished in 2018
Defunct sports competitions in Slovenia